During the 1997–98 season, the club's eighth in Serie A, Parma Associazione Calcio competed in Serie A, the Coppa Italia, and the UEFA Champions League.

Season review
The team had another good season, finishing 6th in the league and thus qualifying for the 1998–99 UEFA Cup, as well as reaching the semi-finals of the Coppa Italia. The team's solitary disappointment was a group stage exit in their first-ever appearance in the UEFA Champions League.

Players

Squad information
Squad at end of season

Transfers

Left club during season

Competitions

Serie A

League table

Results summary

Results by round

Matches

Coppa Italia

Second round

Round of 16

Quarter-finals

Semi-finals

UEFA Champions League

Second qualifying round

Group stage

Statistics

Players statistics

Goalscorers

Last updated: 16 May 1998

References

Parma Calcio 1913 seasons
Parma